Rafael Tristany (1814–1899) was a Spanish Catalan carlist general of the Carlist Wars. He was born in the Province of Lleida in Catalonia. He fought in all three of the Carlist Wars on the side of the Carlists. After the defeat of Carlos, Duke of Madrid in 1876, he went into exile in France, where he died.

References
 Artículo en la Enciclopèdia Catalana (in Catalan) 
 Documental sobre la familia Tristany y el carlismo en Cataluña (in Catalan)

External links
 

1814 births
1899 deaths
People from Solsonès
Military personnel of the First Carlist War